Untitled is a 2011 British drama-horror film directed by Shaun Troke.  Presented in the style of found footage, the film stars Troke alongside Nikki Harrup, Leonora Moore and Danny Goldberg.

Premise 
A filmmaker and his crew spend a weekend making a documentary in a cottage in Wales.  Their film is never completed due to sinister forces in the building.

Cast 
 Shaun Troke as Shaun
 Nikki Harrup as Nikki
 Leonora Moore as Leo
 Danny Goldberg as Danny
 Steve Purbrick as Evan Driscoll
 Holly Kenyon as Celyn Bowen

Production 
Alongside writer Steven Jarrett, Troke explored the background mythology of the film and had created a script by early 2009.  Troke had originally intended to shoot the film by the end of 2009, but, after he was hired to direct the horror film Sparrow, production on Untitled halted.  After working with both Moore and Harrup on Sparrow, Troke ultimately decided to cast both of them in the lead female roles in Untitled.

Accolades 
The film won 'Best Narrative Feature' at the American International Film Festival in September 2011. Untitled will go on a limited cinematic release in 2012.

Marketing and release
Prior to festival release, Untitled used a viral marketing campaign by promoting various clips of the film via the film's official YouTube channel.  Similar to many mockumentary films, this footage was presented as "genuine". Untitled premiered at the American International Film Festival in September 2011.

Reception

References

External links 
 

British independent films
2011 films
British horror films
2011 horror films
Found footage films
2011 independent films
2010s English-language films
2010s British films